Manmunai Pattu Divisional Secretariat is a  Divisional Secretariat  of Batticaloa District, of Eastern Province, Sri Lanka.

References
 Divisional Secretariats Portal

Divisional Secretariats of Batticaloa District